Gwyn Evans (born 6 September 1957 in Maesteg) is a former  international rugby union player. In 1983 he toured New Zealand with the British & Irish Lions. He played club rugby for Maesteg RFC.

Notes

1957 births
Living people
Barbarian F.C. players
British & Irish Lions rugby union players from Wales
Maesteg RFC players
Rugby union fullbacks
Rugby union players from Maesteg
Wales international rugby union players
Welsh rugby union players